Oswald Roux (31 January 1880 – 18 April 1961) was an Austrian painter. His work was part of the painting event in the art competition at the 1936 Summer Olympics.

References

1880 births
1961 deaths
20th-century Austrian painters
Austrian male painters
Olympic competitors in art competitions
Artists from Vienna
20th-century Austrian male artists